Hana Idrettslag is a Norwegian sports club from Sandnes, Rogaland. It has sections for association football, team handball and volleyball.

It was established in 1976, and the club colors are yellow and blue.

The men's football team currently plays in the Fourth Division, the fifth tier of Norwegian football. It last played in the Second Division in 1996. The women's football team plays in the Third Division.

References

 Official site 
 Club page at Norges Fotballforbund 

Football clubs in Norway
Sport in Sandnes
1976 establishments in Norway
Association football clubs established in 1976